Seoul Metropolitan City Route 21 is a road located in Seoul, South Korea.

Stopovers
 Seoul
 Geumcheon District - Gwanak District - Guro District - Dongjak District - Yeongdeungpo District - Yongsan District - Jung District

List of Facilities 
IS: Intersection, IC: Interchange
 (■): National Route 1 overlap

References

Roads in Seoul